This is a list of spaceflight related events which occurred in 1956.

 Manned orbital spaceflight studied
 First nuclear warhead launched on a missile
 Atlas, Titan, Redstone programs going strong
 China begins missile development
 The race to launch a satellite heats up
 Japan's first substantial sounding rocket launched, the Kappa-1, but nation wouldn't go to space until the Kappa-8 in 1960
 First spaceflight launches from Canadian facility at Churchill

Launches

January

|}

February

|}

March

|}

April

|}

May

|}

June

|}

July

|}

August

|}

September

|}

October

|}

November

|}

December

|}

Suborbital launch summary

By country

By rocket

See also
Timeline of spaceflight

References

Footnotes

1956 in spaceflight
Spaceflight by year